Mike Perkins is a British comic book artist known for his inking work and full art duties on comic books such as Captain America, Ruse and Stephen King's The Stand.

Career
Mike Perkins began drawing at a very early age. After attending the Bournville College of Art, Birmingham, England he set himself up as a self-employed artist and pursued work in comics.

As well as illustrating children's books and educational literature, Perkin's career has encompassed computer game design, album covers and business-centered graphic design, although it is probably for his comic book work that he is more widely known.

Perkins' early professional work included work for the British anthology 2000 AD, Marvel UK, Ginn Publishing, Dorling Kindersley and Oxford University Press.

This led to further work in the American market with both DC Comics and Caliber Comics; where he worked on Kilroy is Here, Black Mist, Amongst The Stars, Negative Burn, St. Germaine, Brian Lumley's Necroscope and an adaptation of Doctor Faustus. The latter being a collaboration with Mike Carey, with whom he has worked with throughout his career – most notably on the co-created Carver Hale for 2000 AD and Spellbinders for Marvel Comics.

His first sole inking job, over the pencils of Phil Winslade, led to other inking opportunities at DC and Dark Horse Comics which in turn opened the doors to being asked to join the then new Florida-based comic company CrossGen.

While there, he primarily inked the series Ruse, and worked alongside Mark Waid, Butch Guice and Laura Martin. He also pencilled and inked Archard's Agents and co-created Kiss Kiss Bang Bang with Tony Bedard. He subsequently signed exclusively with Marvel Comics, where he has continued to work until the present time.

At Marvel he has worked on books such as Spider-Man, Fantastic Four, X-Men, Spellbinders, Annihilation: Conquest, House of M: Avengers and Union Jack, but has most notably been part of the artistic team (alongside Steve Epting) on Ed Brubaker run of Captain America.

His most recent project is illustrating The Stand: Captain Trips, Marvel Comics' adaptation of Stephen King's novel, The Stand on which he collaborates once more with colourist Laura Martin.

Bibliography
 Tharg's Future Shocks:
 "It's a Cold World" (with James Oswald, in 2000 AD No. 865, 1993)
 "The Star!" (with Peter Hogan, in 2000 AD No. 938, 1995)
Judge Dredd: "Lethal Response" (with Gordon Rennie, in Judge Dredd Yearbook 1995, 1994
Tharg's Terror Tales: "A Man Called Fear" (with Martin Conaghan, in 2000AD Yearbook 1995, 1995)
 Negative Burn No. 28, 31, 38–41 (1995–1996)
Vector 13:
 "Case Nine: Blackout" (with Dan Abnett, in 2000 AD No. 973, 1996)
 "Case Five: Patent Pending" (with Gordon Rennie, in 2000 AD #1028, 1997)
 Big Book of (with Jonathan Vankin, Paradox Press):
 Big Book of Scandal: "...The Ice Cream Blonde" (1998)
 Big Book of Grimm: "Three Snake Leaves" (1999)
 Big Book of the 70s: "'Jiggle' Shows" (2000)
 Superman vs. The Terminator: Death to the Future (inks, with writer Alan Grant and pencils by Steve Pugh, 4-issue mini-series, DC Comics and Dark Horse Comics, 2000)
 Green Lantern vs. Aliens (inks, with writer Ron Marz and pencils by Rick Leonardi, DC Comics and Dark Horse Comics, 2000)
 Aliens versus Predator: Xenogenesis (inks, with writer Andi Watson and pencils by Mel Rubi, Dark Horse Comics, 2000)
 Aliens vs. Predator/Witchblade/Darkness: Mindhunter (inks, with writer David Quinn, and pencils by Mel Rubi, Dark Horse Comics, 4-issues miniseries, 2000, trade paperback, 96 pages, 2001)
Carver Hale: Twisting the Knife (with writer Mike Carey and some inks by Dylan Teague, in 2000 AD #1236–1240, 1247–1249, 2001, trade paperback, 2005)
 Ruse #1–5, 7–14, 16–19, 21–24, 26 (inks, with writer Mark Waid, and pencils by Jackson Guice, CrossGen, 2001–2004)
The Life and Time of Ulli & Marquand and Their Misadventures in Mordheim, City of the Damned (with Gordon Rennie, Gavin Thorpe, and Karl Kopinski, Black Library, 80 pages, 2002)
 Kiss Kiss Bang Bang (pencils, with writer Tony Bedard and inks by Andrew Hennessy, CrossGen, 2004)
Spellbinders: Signs and Wonders (pencils, with Mike Carey and inks by Andrew Hennessy, Marvel Comics, 6-issue mini-series, trade paperback, 144 pages, 2005)
 Captain America No. 8, 10–17, 19, 22–24, 26–30, 34–36 (inks, with Ed Brubaker and pencils by Mike Perkins & Steve Epting, Marvel Comics, 2005-ongoing)
 X-Men: Deadly Genesis No. 2 (inks, with Ed Brubaker and pencils by Trevor Hairsine, Marvel Comics, 2006)
 Union Jack: London Falling (pencils, with writer Christos Gage and inks by Andrew Hennessy, 4-issue mini-series, February 2007 – July 2007, trade paperback, 96 pages, July 2007)
Annihilation: Conquest – Prologue (with Dan Abnett/Andy Lanning, one-shot, Marvel Comics, August 2007)  	
 House of M: Avengers (with writer Christos Gage, 5-issue mini-series, Marvel Comics, 2008)
 The Stand (with Roberto Aguirre-Sacasa, Marvel, October 2008-forthcoming)
Origins of Marvel Comics (with Fred Van Lente, one-shot, Marvel Comics, July 2010) short stories:
 "Moon Knight"
 "Captain America"
 Rowans Ruin (with Mike Carey)
Deathlok (with Nathan Edmondson, Marvel Comics, December 2014-September 2015)

References

General references

Mike Perkins at Barney

Inline citations

External links

 
 
 

Living people
British comics artists
British illustrators
British children's book illustrators 
Year of birth missing (living people)
Place of birth missing (living people)
Alumni of the Bournville College of Art